The Manson engine is a hot air engine that was first described by  A. D. Manson in the March 1952 issue of Newnes Practical Mechanics-Magazines.  Manson Engines can be started both ways (clockwise and anti-clockwise). It has a stepped piston. The front part is acting as a displacer and the back part as work piston (displacer and piston move as a single component). The engine only requires three moving parts (piston, piston rod and crank).

The engine is double acting, as it is using both the expansion of the warmed air and the contraction of cooling air to exploit work.

The engine has no commercial or practical application. The engines are built mainly as desk toys, physics demonstrations, and novelties.

Functioning mechanism 

 Phase 1 (cooling down the work medium, suction stroke)
 when the Piston is moved towards the heat source, the hot gas inside the engine is moved to the cool side of the cylinder.
 the gas is cooled there, resulting in a drop in pressure, further moving the piston towards the heat source.
 Phase 2 (top dead center)
 When the piston reaches top dead center, the inlet valve is open, releasing the vacuum.
 the flywheel keeps the piston moving
 Phase 3 (heating up the work medium, expansion stroke)
 when the piston is moving away from the heat source, the air is pushed towards the heat source.
 the air is then heating up, resulting in the air expanding and the piston being further pushed away from the heat source
 Phase 4 (bottom dead center)
 when the piston reaches bottom dead center, the exhaust valve is open, releasing the build up pressure and hot air.
 the flywheel keeps the piston moving

Differences to Stirling engines 
Stirling engines are typically closed systems, while the Manson Engines are open system. The displacer and work piston of the Manson Engine have zero phase angle.

Variations 

 Manson-Guise Engine

The valve/gas paths are considered by some to be complicated to manufacture, so various variants exists with improved/modified simplified vales/gas paths.

Sources 

Hot air engines